The Berrybender Narratives is a series of novels written by Larry McMurtry.  It tells the story of an ill-fated hunting expedition lasting several years and covering much of the early American West.  As with much of McMurtry's Western fiction, it weaves a tale of bloody adventure with a sort of ghastly dark humor.

The four novels in the series, with publication dates, are:

 Sin Killer (2002)
 The Wandering Hill (2003)
 By Sorrow's River (2003)
 Folly and Glory (2004)

 
Novel series
Western (genre) novels
Western United States in fiction